The 20s decade ran from January 1, AD 20, to December 31, AD 29.

In Europe, the 20s saw revolts by the Aedui, Thracian tribesmen, and the Frisians against the Roman Empire. In North Africa, Tacfarinas, a Numidian Berber deserter, led the Musulamii tribe and a loose and changing coalition of other Berber tribes in revolt, before being defeated in AD 24. In China, the Xin dynasty collapsed and the Eastern Han dynasty was established. In Korea, Daemusin of Goguryeo annexed Dongbuyeo and killed its king Daeso.

In science, the 20s saw the manufacture of pens and metal writing tools in Rome. Major disasters of this decade include a fire in Rome, and the collapse of a poorly built amphitheatre in Fidenae, which killed 20,000 of the 50,000 spectators. In 27, Christianity was born as a Jewish sect in Jerusalem. Geographica, an encyclopedia of geographical knowledge created by Strabo, was finished no later than AD 23.

Manning (2008) tentatively estimates the world population in AD 20 as 246 million.

Demographics 

Due to lack of reliable demographic data, estimates of the world population in the 1st century vary wildly, with estimates for AD 1 varying from 150 to 300 million. Demographers typically do not attempt to estimate most specific years in antiquity, instead giving approximate numbers for round years such as AD 1 or AD 200. However, attempts at reconstructing the world population in more specific years have been made, with Manning (2008) tentatively estimating the world population in AD 20 as 246 million.

Significant people
 Tiberius, Roman Emperor (AD 14–37)

References